is a city located in Sōya Subprefecture, Hokkaido, Japan. It is the capital of Sōya Subprefecture. It contains Japan's northernmost point, Cape Sōya, from which the Russian island of Sakhalin can be seen.

As of 1 June 1975, the city has an estimated population of 55,465 and a population density of 72.8 persons per km2 (189 persons per mi2).

Wakkanai is also home to Japan's first nursing home built inside the central train station of its city, a novel approach to caring for Japan's growing elderly population that has since been imitated in several other cities.

History
Wakkanai was originally home to an Ainu population. The first Japanese settlement was established in 1685.

1879: The village of Wakkanai was founded.
1897: Sōya Subprefecture established.
1901: Wakkanai village became Wakkanai town.
1949: Wakkanai town became Wakkanai city.
1955: Soya village was merged into Wakkanai city.
1959: Wakkanai Airport opened.

During World War II:  The Imperial Japanese Navy used the harbor and port as a submarine base.  Wakkanai was  far enough north to be outside the range of American heavy bombers and was safe from air attack.  Until the early to mid-1960s, the northern portion of the harbor remained divided by concrete sub-mooring pens.  The large breakwater structure (which still exists) was actually a sub-repair facility.  At the shore end there was a huge winching mechanism capable of hauling subs up into the partially enclosed structure where they could be repaired while completely out of the water.  Built into the hills above the city there were several reinforced concrete bunker-type caves where (anecdotally) they were used either to store ammunition and armament, or as air raid shelters for the civilian populace.  History would suggest the former use, rather than the latter. During a re-build/renovation of the harbor sometime during the 1960s or 1970s, the harbor was cleared of the concrete pens and the machinery was removed from the breakwater structure which was reconfigured.

Geography

Japan's northernmost point,  Cape Sōya, is located in Wakkanai, which is on a peninsula jutting towards Sakhalin Island in Russia, which is 43 kilometers (27 miles) away. On a clear day, the Russian island can be easily seen. There is also an island called Benten-jima located northwest of Cape Sōya.
 Rivers: Koetoi River
 Lakes: Ōnuma Lake

Surrounding municipalities
 Toyotomi
 Sarufutsu

Climate
Wakkanai has a humid continental climate (Köppen: Dfb) typical of Hokkaido but with strong influence of the ocean as island portions near the great land masses (such as the smaller islands of Nova Scotia), with cold winters, warm summers and generally heavy precipitation from the Aleutian Low, whose winds hit the city direct from the Sea of Japan but with strong oceanic influence (46 °F). The winter is cold enough not to fall in a "Cfb" climate and the summers although very mild for typical climate "b" is warm enough to fall into a "Dfc", both in the classification of Koppen. For comparison, Nain in Canada receives  of snow.

The city's port is usually usable throughout the year, but does occasionally freeze in cold winters.

Transportation

Air
Wakkanai Airport is located in Wakkanai. There is a daily flight to New Chitose Airport near Sapporo and there is also a daily flight to Tokyo Haneda Airport.

Rail
JR Hokkaido runs diesel train services on the Sōya Main Line from Wakkanai to Nayoro, Asahikawa and Sapporo. The Sōya limited express runs once a day to and from Sapporo, while the Sarobetsu runs twice a day to and from Asahikawa, with a change of trains to either a Lilac or Kamui limited express service at Asahikawa required to reach Sapporo.
 Sōya Main Line :  -  -  - 

Above are the stations located in Wakkanai.

There are plans for a massive extension of the Trans-Siberian Railway. If becoming a reality, it would go via Sakhalin and end in Wakkanai.

Sea

Heartland Ferry operates seasonal ferry service to Rebun Island and Rishiri Island. Ferry service to Korsakov on Sakhalin Island was terminated on September 18, 2015. Wakkanai governor KUDO Hiroshi pledged to restore ferry service to Sakhalin and in 2016, the route resumed operation between the months of June and September of each year and is commercially operated by the Commonwealth of Dominica flagged vessel Penguin 33, which is a High-speed craft owned by Penguin International Limited and operated by Sakhalin Shipping Company.

Education

University
 Wakkanai Hokusei Gakuen University

High schools

Public
 Hokkaido Wakkanai High School

Private
 Wakkanai Otani High School

Tourist attractions

 The Daisuke Matsuzaka Museum, dedicated to the baseball pitcher "Dice-K" and opened in 2008, is located in Wakkanai, which is his father's hometown.
 Wakkanai Park, home to the Centennial Tower, commemorating the 100th anniversary of the founding of the city, and the Hoppo Memorial Museum
 Cape Sōya, home to a monument to the northernmost point in Japan
 Hokumon Jinja, a Shinto shrine
 Wakkanai Onsen Dome, Japan's northernmost onsen.

Mascots

Rinzou-kun is a descendant of Mamiya Rinzō who explored the Strait of Tartary in what is now Russia.
Dashinosuke is a green harbor seal who is Rinzou-kun's assistant. His flippers and his tail resembled kelp. He loves fish and shellfish.

Sister cities and friendship cities

Sister city
  Baguio, Philippines (since 1973)

Friendship cities

Domestic
  Ishigaki, Okinawa (since 1987)
  Makurazaki, Kagoshima (since 2012)

International
  Nevelsk, Russia (since 1972)
  Korsakov, Russia (since 1992)
  Yuzhno-Sakhalinsk, Russia (since 2001)

Sister ports
  Port of Anchorage, United States (since 1982)

References

External links 
 
 
 Official Website 

 
Cities in Hokkaido
Port settlements in Japan
Populated coastal places in Japan